Dardo was the name of at least two ships of the Italian Navy and may refer to:

 , a  launched in 1900 and discarded in 1920.
 , a  launched in 1930, captured by Germany in 1943 and renamed TA31. She was scuttled in 1945.

Italian Navy ship names